Samsami (also Romanized as Şamşāmī) is a city in Doab Samsami District of Kuhrang County, Chaharmahal and Bakhtiari province, Iran. At the 2006 census, its population was 354 in 69 households, when it was a village. The following census in 2011 counted 491 people in 100 households. The latest census in 2016 showed a population of 1,203 people in 365 households, by which time it had been elevated to the status of a city. The city is populated by Lurs.

References 

Kuhrang County

Cities in Chaharmahal and Bakhtiari Province

Populated places in Chaharmahal and Bakhtiari Province

Populated places in Kuhrang County

Luri settlements in Chaharmahal and Bakhtiari Province